Suleman Dawood School of Business (SDSB) is the constituent business school of the Lahore University of Management Sciences (LUMS). Established in 1986, it is the oldest of school at LUMS. It is named after Pakistani business tycoon Suleman Dawood, father of former commerce minister Abdul Razak Dawood and is Pakistan's only AACSB accredited school.

The school's curriculum was designed in partnership with Harvard Business School and Ivey Business School. As of 2016, the school is home to 23 doctorate students. QS World University Rankings ranked the school as the top business school in Pakistan and the 251st globally.

The school publishes the biannual SDSB 360 magazine which features articles about industry leaders, rising alumni and faculty research.

Degrees and programs
The school provides 11 programs in various concentrations at the undergraduate, graduate and postgraduate level.

Undergraduate Programs

 BSc Accounting and Finance
 BSc Management Sciences

Graduate Programs

 MBA
 Executive MBA
 MS Accounting and Analytics
 MS Business and Public Policy
 MS Financial Management
 MS Healthcare Management and Innovation
 MS Supply Chain and Retail Management
 MS Technology Management and Entrepreneurship 
 PhD Management

References

Lahore University of Management Sciences
Business schools in Pakistan